Karomatullo Qurbonov (29 November 1961 – 17 October 1992) was a popular pop singer and composer from Tajikistan. On 17 October 1992 Qurbonov and a number of his band members were murdered by gunmen from the Popular Front militia. Qurbonov was one of a number of intellectual and cultural figures murdered during the Tajik Civil War. In 2008 a former member of the Popular Front, Mahmadahdi Nazarov, also known as Makhsum Mahdi, was convicted of Qurbonov's murder.

Qurbonov's daughter, Noziya Karomatullo, is one of the most popular musicians in Tajikistan today.

References

External links
His videos on Youtube
 that Noziya Karomatullo dedicated to her father Karomatullo Qurbonov

Tajikistani musicians
1961 births
1992 deaths
People from Khatlon Region
Tajikistani murder victims
20th-century Tajikistani musicians
20th-century Tajikistani singers